Don't! Buy! Thai! was a campaign initiated in the early 1990s by child welfare advocate and author Andrew Vachss to boycott goods and services produced in Thailand until its government introduced formal and practical reforms to significantly curtail the prostitution of children.

The organization of Don't! Buy! Thai! was willfully informal, with promoters refusing donations.

The campaign had great difficulty attracting attention from television, radio, and print media, so discussion was conducted largely on the Internet. Online, it came under vociferous attack by Sean Parlaman, who presented himself as a crusader against the prostitution of children. Parlaman variously accused the Don't! Buy! Thai! campaigners of being fundamentalist Christians, right-wing bigots, and pedophiles.

In 2000, frustrated by the lack of traction and noting that the prostitution of children to sex tourists had become less concentrated in Thailand, Vachss and most of those involved abandoned the boycott.

References

 de Lint, Charles; “Books to Look for”, The Magazine of Fantasy & Science Fiction, v 89 #4 (October/November 1995).
 Herbert, Bob; “In America; Kids for Sale”, New York Times, 22 January 1996.
 Bishop, Ryan, and Lillian S. Robinson; “Batman: The Ultimate Evil”, the Nation, 29 January 1996.
 van Esterik, Penny; Materializing Thailand (2000), Berg .

External links
 Don't! Buy! Thai!
 “An Update on Don't! Buy! Thai!” at The Zero, from 20 December 2000, declaring a halt

See also 

 Do not buy Russian goods!
 Boycott Chinese products
 Great American Boycott

Thailand
Community organizing
Child prostitution
Child labour-related organizations
Child abuse-related organizations
Sex industry in Thailand
Foreign relations of Thailand
Organizations disestablished in 2000
Organizations established in the 1990s
Foreign trade of Thailand